Ramal de Alfarelos is a railway branch in Portugal, which connects the Western Line (at Bifurcação de Lares) to the Northern Line (at Alfarelos), offering a connection between Figueira da Foz and Coimbra.

CP offers both urban and regional services on this branch, as part of the Coimbra urban trains (connecting Coimbra to Figueira da Foz through Alfarelos) and of the Western Line.

See also 
 List of railway lines in Portugal
 List of Portuguese locomotives and railcars
 History of rail transport in Portugal

References

Sources
 

Railway lines in Portugal
Iberian gauge railways